The second Alice (SP-367)-a motorboat built in 1913 at Morris Heights, N.Y., by the Gas Engine & Power Co. & Charles L. Seabury Co.-was acquired by the Navy from Mr. David H. Morris, of New York City, on 8 May 1917 and commissioned on 29 September 1917.

Assigned to the 3rd Naval District, she served as a dispatch boat through the end of World War I, transporting inspection and inventory parties around New York harbor. She was decommissioned on 9 May 1919, and her name was struck from the Navy list on 7 July 1919. On 5 August 1919, she was sold to Mr. Reinhard Hall, of New York, NY.

References
 
  NavSource Online: Section Patrol Craft Photo Archive Alice (SP 367)

1913 ships
Patrol vessels of the United States Navy
Ships built in Morris Heights, Bronx